Don Fernando (born April 12, 1948) is a director and actor of pornographic films. He started  in the pornography business in 1977 and performed for 39 consecutive years; the longest tenure for any male pornographic film actor in the world, until his retirement in 2016. He won the Best Supporting Actor Award twice (1995 and in 2005) during the Festival de Cine Erotica-Barcelona Fernando was inducted into the X-Rated Critics Organization Hall of Fame in 1997. He was inducted into the AVN Hall of Fame during the 2004 AVN Awards.

References

External links
 
 
 

1948 births
American male pornographic film actors
American pornographic film directors
Hispanic and Latino American pornographic film actors
Living people